David Gordon Ullman (born March 15, 1944 in Washington, D.C.) is an American author, professor, and a specialist on product design and decision making best practices. Ullman is best known for his textbook The Mechanical Design Process, used by universities globally. To date, Ullman's work has been cited more than 7,000 times with 2,000 citations. Ullman has a PhD in mechanical engineering from The Ohio State University and was professor of mechanical design at Oregon State University for 20 years. He is a Life Fellow of the American Society of Mechanical Engineers (ASME) and founder of its Design Theory and Methodology committee.

Publications

Books
 The Mechanical Design Process , McGraw-Hill, NY, 6th Edition.
Concurrent Engineering: The Product Development Environment for the 1990s, Mentor Graphics, 1991.

Journals and papers 

Ullman, D.G., T.G. Dietterich, "Toward Expert CAD," ASME, Computers in Mechanical Engineering ," Vol. 6, No. 3, Nov.-Dec. 1987, pp. 56-70

References 

American mechanical engineers
American industrial engineers
Engineering educators
Ohio State University College  of Engineering alumni
American engineering writers
American aerospace engineers
Engineers from Washington, D.C.
Artificial intelligence researchers
Oregon State University faculty
21st-century American educators
American textbook writers